The Rastrojero Conosur is a passenger car that was based on the utilitarian, second-generation Rastrojero Diesel. It is a 4-door sedan especially designed for use in taxi fleets. This car was built by the state enterprise State Mechanical Industries, of Argentina, from 1974 until 1979, when they ended the operations of this factory.

The car was aesthetically similar to a Diesel Rastrojero double cab, but the part where the cargo box should go had a trunk designed with a small slope, leaving aside the straight line of the box of the original model.

As far as its mechanics are concerned, it was the same as the pickup. A 4.88 Indenor XD engine  that delivers an output of 60 hp, powered by diesel oil through an indirect injection system Bosch EP / VA, all coupled to a 4-speed Borgward gearbox.

Its production ended on May 22 of 1979, as the entire line and all products Rastrojero. Their production was mainly for use as a taxi, even today, some models tend to be restored though not as taxis, but as private vehicles.

See also
 IAME (State Aeronautical and Mechanical Industries)
 Rastrojero
 List of cars manufactured in Argentina
 Lists of automobiles
 List of automobile manufacturers

References

External links 
 Technical details of the Rastrojero Conosur
 [https://web.archive.org/web/20200919072913/http://www.cocheargentino.com.ar/r/rastrojero.htm#frontalito}

Cars of Argentina
Cars introduced in 1974